A Mechina Kdam-Tzvait ("pre-military preparatory", plural  Mechinot) is an autonomous unit of specialized educational institutions valuing non-formal education and pre-military training in Israel. Funded and supported by the Ministry of Education and Ministry of Defense, as well as by the Israeli Defense Forces. As for 2017, there are 46 mechinot whose mission is to prepare for the conscientious service in the army, and to educate leaders of local communities that could affect society and state. Educational program blocks mostly include: Judaism and Jewish identity, Zionism, development of leadership skills, volunteering, and elements of military training. Most mechina programs last one academic year.

Students 
Training in mechinot is based on values of Zionism, democracy, pluralism and tolerance. In most cases, tuition is largely provided with state funding and scholarships.

Alumni 
Almost 90% of Mechina graduates hold high posts in the IDF, according to the Mechina Law, which was adopted by the Knesset in 2008. This is often work in combat and special units that directly deal with hostilities.

25% of officer graduates and 10% of graduates of the prestigious pilots course at the Israeli Air Force Flight Academy are previous Mechina graduates. Commanders of battalions and divisions give preference to graduates of mechinas, as the year of training, personal development and volunteering prepares them to become mature leaders who are ready to take responsibility, lead by example, and solve difficult situations that demand a high morale and serious experience with human dilemmas.

Pre-army mechinot
There are four types of pre-army mechinot:
 Religious
 Secular
 Joint religious and secular
 International programs

Religious pre-army mechina
A religious mechina is intended for graduates of a yeshiva high school or a religious high school, and prepares them for their service in the Israel Defense Forces. Focus is placed on preparing them for the encounter with secular society in the army by studying "Machshava" - Jewish thought, beliefs, and outlooks. Students also prepare physically for their service period, and receive leadership training from active-duty officers.

The first religious mechina, Bnei David, was founded in 1988 in Eli, a Jewish settlement in the West Bank.

Other religious mechinot:
 Ateret Cohanim in (East Jerusalem)
 AMIT Rosh Pina in Rosh Pinna
 Arzei HaLevanon in Ma'ale Efraim (West Bank)
 Carmey Hayil in Beit Rimon
 Hemdat Yehuda in Hemdat (West Bank)
 Elisha in Halamish (West Bank)
 Eretz HaTzvi in Peduel (West Bank)
 Katzrin in Katzrin (Golan Heights)
 Kiryat Malachi in Kiryat Malachi
 Keshet Yehuda Pre Military Academy in Keshet (Golan Heights)
 Magen Shaul in Nokdim (West Bank)
 Maskiot in Shadmot Mehola (West Bank)
 Otzem AKA Atzmona after their previous location, currently located in Nave.
 Yatir in Beit Yatir (West Bank)
 Yemin Orde in Hatzor HaGlilit

Secular pre-army mechina

A secular mechina focuses on preparing high school graduates for citizenship as well as IDF service. The program of studies covers leadership, principles, and practice of democracy, volunteer service to the community, ideological and individual identity, Zionism, Jewish history and heritage, philosophy, and more. While "secular" in matters of religious observance, the program of study includes Judaism with a focus on ethics and tradition.

The first secular mechina was Nahshon, founded in 1997 in Nili in the West Bank.

Other secular mechinot:

 Aderet at Moshav Aderet
 Meitzar (Golan Heights)
 Ma'ayan Baruch
 Mechinat BINA in Tel Aviv
 Mechinat Rabin in Kiryat Tiv'on
 Mechinat Hanegev
 Mechinat Tavor
 Minsharim Kalu at Ma'agan Michael
 Mechinat Be'er Ora
 Mechinat Erez Be'er Sheva
 Mechinat Iftach at Kibbutz Ravid

Joint religious and secular pre-army mechina

The joint religious and secular Mechinot were founded to help bridge the widening gaps in Israeli society. As such, they focus on teaching a range of subjects to a mixed student body, including Zionism, leadership, Judaism, political science, philosophy, alongside intensive community and societal involvement and volunteering.

Joint religious and secular mechinot:

 The Hannaton Mechina at Kibbutz Hannaton (Masorti/Conservative)
 Beit Yisrael at Kibbutz Beit Yisrael in Gilo (East Jerusalem)
 Ein Prat (co-ed) in Kfar Adumim (West Bank)
 Gal (a new mechina) in Akko
 HaEmek (co-ed) in Kibbutz Kfar Ruppin, est. 2006
 Jaffa (Reform) in Tel Aviv-Yafo
 Amichai (co-ed) in Kibbutz Kramim
 Nachshon (co-ed) has three campuses in the Northern Negev

International mechinas 

Many mechinas accept Jewish students from abroad who are looking for an immersive gap year experience in Israel with Israelis. There are at least three English speaking mechinas that are designed specifically to serve the needs of its international students. Mechinat "Kol Ami" is operated by the Jewish Agency and "Artzi" is an independent mechina that specializes in drama and the arts.

International religious students

Mechinat Keshet Yehuda specializes in helping religious men ages 17–21 from English speaking countries prepare for the IDF by integrating them into the Israeli student body and providing ulpan (Hebrew classes) and Torah learning in English. The program has been successfully helping young men from overseas for over 15 years. Most come with little or no Hebrew, without family or friends. By the end of the program, they are IDF ready, a high level of Hebrew proficiency and a great network of new friends. Keshet even has an adoption program to help the boys feel they have family in Israel too.

College preparatory programs
Several frameworks operate in Israel to prepare for entrance to institutions of higher (post-secondary) education those students who otherwise lack the necessary academic qualifications. These are geared for various populations.

Academic mechinot
These are operated by Israeli universities, for students with an Israeli high school education.

Mechinat olim
A mechinat olim (immigrants' preparatory) is designed specifically for prospective, new, or recent immigrants intending to study in an Israeli institution of higher education. The programs are generally conducted for one year, and all courses are taught in Hebrew. The program has two basic goals: 
 to raise the student's level of Hebrew, including those who started with no prior knowledge of the language, suitable for enrolling in post-secondary academic coursework
 acquainting the student with academic material as taught in the Hebrew language, including subjects from the Israeli curriculum such as civics and Jewish history

Mechinot olim offers different content-based tracks of study (i.e. life science, humanities, social sciences, or physical science). The Technion will only accept students from its own mechina.

Remedial courses preparatory to higher education
In addition to the above, there are private (i. e., commercial) educational institutions in Israel offering remedial courses for students after high school who wish to complete or upgrade their scores in their subject matriculations or prepare for the psychometric examinations required for entrance to college or university.

See also
Service Year
Education in Israel

References

External links
 Joint Council of Mechinot
 Mechinot at the Ministry of Education (Hebrew)

Pre-army 
 Jewish Agency for Israel, Two Army Mechinot
 Rochelle Furstenberg: Israeli Life: Idealism From Below Hadassah Magazine, October 2008 Vol. 90 No. 2

Academic
 the Mechina of the Hebrew University of Jerusalem
 the Mechina of the Technion

Olim 
 the Mechina for immigrants of the Technion
 the Mechina of Tel Aviv University

 
Jewish educational institutions
Hebrew words and phrases
Israel Defense Forces